The tenth season of the stop-motion television series Robot Chicken began airing in the United States on Cartoon Network's late night programming block, Adult Swim, on September 30, 2019, containing 20 episodes.

Episodes

Notes

References 

2019 American television seasons
2020 American television seasons
Robot Chicken seasons